Nanma is a 2007 Indian Malayalam-language action drama film, directed by Sarathchandran Wayanad, starring Kalabhavan Mani and Rahman.

Plot
For a living, Muthu extracts and disposes corpses from rivers. Unknown to Muthu, his son becomes a henchman for a money lender as he wants his father to have a respectable job.

Cast
 Kalabhavan Mani	
 Rahman
 Adithya Menon	
 Dhanya Mary Varghese
 Manikandan
 Ponnamma Babu

Reception
The Times of India said the director, "Sharath Chandra Wynad has lived up to the expectations of Malayalam viewers’ story, screenplay and direction".

References

External links

2007 films
2000s Malayalam-language films